Chiplun taluka is a taluka in Ratnagiri district of Maharashtra, India. As per Census 2011, there are 2 towns and 165 villages within Chiplun Taluka.

Ratnagiri district 
The taluka is one of nine talukas in Ratnagiri district, the others being Ratnagiri, Rajapur, Lanja, Sangmeshwar Guhagar, Khed, Dapoli and Mandangad.

Tourist attractions 
Vashishti River, Lord Parashurama Temple and Gowalkot fort are the main attractions of Chiplun. Sawatsada Waterfalls, Koyna Dam, Nehru Smriti Udyan, Nageshwar Temple, etc. are few other tourist spots in Chiplun taluka. Famous Math of Shree Swami Samarth and Shivsrushti is at Dervan Village.

See also
 Chiplun
 Konkan
 Konkan division
 Western Ghats
 Chiplun Instagram Account

External links 
 Chiplun Instagram Account

References

Talukas in Ratnagiri district